Acoma is a genus of May beetles and junebugs in the family Scarabaeidae. There are at least 30 described species in Acoma.

ITIS Taxonomic note: 
Beetle genus Acoma Casey, 1889 is a senior homonym of nematode genus Acoma Steiner, 1920.

Species

References

Further reading

External links

 

Melolonthinae